"Dead No More: The Clone Conspiracy" is a 2016–17 Marvel Comics storyline starring Spider-Man. The story was notable for bringing long-dead Spider-Man supporting character Ben Reilly back to life. The storyline led Reilly to reclaim the heroic Scarlet Spider mantle and appear in his own comic book series. The story received generally mixed reviews, with critics praising the art style and action, however criticized the story and the retcons, as well as the treatment of Ben Reilly.

Premise
This storyline details Jackal resurfacing as he manages to get Rhino, Lizard, Doctor Octopus and a female Electro on his side with a chance to reunite with their loved ones.

Plot

Prologue
Jackal resurfaces in the form of a mysterious man in a red suit with an Anubis mask. Approaching several of Spider-Man's enemies, Jackal offers a deal to them in the form of the chance to revive their lost loved ones if they follow his orders. He starts with Rhino presenting him with a mysteriously-revived Oksana. Rhino accepts the deal.

Jackal then heads to Andru Correctional Facility where he visits Lizard. Lizard accepts Jackal's offer when introduced to the revived Martha Connors and Billy Connors.

Giving Rhino a new black version of his suit, Jackal sends Rhino to break out Lizard and a depowered Electro from Andru Correctional Facility. Afterwards, he offers Electro help to regain his electrical powers.

Jackal later sends Rhino to convince Kingpin to join up with him while using a revived Vanessa Fisk as persuasion. Kingpin snaps the neck of Vanessa Fisk, calling her an abomination and not his real wife. Spider-Man appears at Fisk Industries as Kingpin goes after Rhino. Upon hearing that Kingpin declined the offer, Jackal tells Rhino that he has gained one strike. Jackal is then seen with a revived Gwen Stacy at his side.

Lead-in plot
After J. Jonah Jameson Sr. has been hospitalized at Mount Sinai Hospital upon coughing up blood, Peter Parker, Aunt May, and J. Jonah Jameson visit him. After being told by Dr. McCray that J. Jonah Jameson Sr. is undergoing treatment, Jameson blames Peter for what happened to his father claiming that he must have come down with a disease which led to Jameson Sr. calming him down and Dr. McCray stating that the disease is hereditary. Outside of Jameson Sr.'s room, Peter and Jameson are approached by Dr. Rita Clarkson of New U Technologies who had been called to the hospital by Dr. McCray. She says that New U Technologies has cutting edge technology with which they want Jameson Sr. to be a test subject of. Jameson storms off in anger while Parker wants to have the full details to them. At Edmond, Oklahoma, a chemical plant that is owned by Parker Industries suddenly catches fire. On his plane, Peter reads the research from New U Technologies where the latest technologies has them making new organs from the subject's DNA that do not have any genetic defects to them. While Anna Maria Marconi suspects that it has something to do with mad science, Parker is already starting to consider the possibilities. Within Living Brain, Doctor Octopus' consciousness is starting to take note of the procedure. Parker and Anna then get word about what happened in Edmond, Oklahoma. Meanwhile, Jackal had been working with the Lizard and Martha Connors in an experiment to restore Electro's powers to him. Upon Electro's reluctance to proceed with the procedure, the Jackal had then presented a mysteriously-revived Francine Frye (without the tattoos and piercings), a former love of Electro's that he inadvertently killed when his powers were out of control after being experimented on by the Superior Spider-Man. Electro finally ceded and agreed to do whatever Jackal wanted. Before continuing, Martha Connors informs Jackal about the fire in Edmond, Oklahoma and watches the news to see Spider-Man's arrival as none of them had any involvement with the incident. Spider-Man arrives at the scene of the explosion where a police officer tells him that there are six trapped workers within the chemical plant. Spider-Man gets five of them out and goes back for the sixth, one Jerry Salteres, who he gets out from under the rubble before the chemicals explode. At the nearby hospital where the chemical plant workers were taken, Peter Parker discovers from the doctor that Jerry had inhaled some chemicals that damaged his heart and lungs. Upon going into the closet, Peter Parker contacts Dr. Clarkson to have her people work on Jerry Salteres in order to save his life. The operation is a success, but Peter's spider-senses go off. At New U Technologies' headquarters in San Francisco, Jameson meets with Dr. Clarkson and states that he wants to see proof that their technology works. He gets his proof when Dr. Clarkson calls out a revived Marla Madison-Jameson.

It was revealed that the revived ones were clones, created by Jackal to bring the villains to do his bidding. Jackal went awry that Francine's DNA cloned was mixed in with Electro's DNA. This led to Electro dying upon Francine absorbing the electricity and becoming the new Electro instead. When Prowler infiltrated New U Technologies on Peter Parker's behalf and was accidentally killed by Francine during a chase, Jackal revived him while providing Francine a suit when she becomes the new Electro. Upon becoming loyal to Jackal, Prowler was used by Jackal to find out what Parker Industries is up to.

When Peter Parker scanned Living Brain to find out why it was acting unusually, Doctor Octopus' consciousness asked why it was erased. Realizing the truth, Peter Parker shut down Living Brain only for Doctor Octopus' consciousness to reactivate Living Brain and cause it to self-destruct while escaping in the Octobot. Arriving at New U Enterprises, the Doctor Octopus-possessed Octobot plans to get his biological body back, convinced that the consciousness in Parker's body was 'infected' by its time in Spider-Man's body to believe that Peter was superior rather than himself.

With J. Jonah Jameson Sr.'s health having taken a turn for the worse, Peter has to endure Jonah's and May's concerns for his extreme skepticism for using New U, with his secret identity preventing him from informing them of the real reason he doubts them. Peter remains adamant of sticking to the conventional procedure and J. Jonah Jameson Sr. has sided with him. Peter's superheroic endeavors prevent him from accompanying May and Jonah as J. Jonah Jameson Sr.'s health reaches critical status and he undergoes conventional surgery. To make matters worse, this is not enough and J. Jonah Jameson Sr. passes away.

Main plot
J. Jonah Jameson Sr. (in The Amazing Spider-Man (vol. 4) #4) and Aunt May were in Madagascar. He picked up a disease and, unaware that he was deathly ill, Aunt May and Jay went to a big party for the defeat of Regent, a villain after all of humanity's heroes and villains powers. After attending J. Jonah Jameson Sr.'s funeral, Peter decides to pay Jerry Salteres a visit in order to investigate why his spider-sense went off in his presence. When they reach his house, his wife Emma reveals that New U had mysteriously taken Jerry away after he had accidentally forgotten to take a post-procedure daily pill prescribed by New U and his health decayed. As Spider-Man, Peter infiltrates the New U Headquarters and tries to locate Jerry using a microscopic spider-tracer he had tagged him with at the hospital once his spider-sense had gone off. Spider-Man delves deep into the laboratory and discovers several stasis tubes, with one of them apparently containing nothing but Jerry's nervous system, completely stripped off his body, and alive. Spider-Man is soon sighted by one of Miles Warren's clone/assistants, who calls the Rhino and Electro for help. After dispatching the two villains, Spider-Man continues to pursue Miles, only to find Gwen Stacy herself behind a closed door. The shock of Gwen's presence prevents Spidey from reacting to his spider-sense on time, and he is sucker-punched by the returned Doctor Octopus. In a side-story, Gwen is supposedly resurrected by Jackal and his clones. The Jackal claims that this one is not a clone, but the real Gwen who was harvested from her remains and still remembers everything in her life including her death (during which she was apparently aware but paralyzed by Green Goblin's gas and learned that Peter was Spider-Man). Jackal offers Gwen the opportunity to be his business partner as he tries to change the world with his new technology. Gwen is hesitant about this new life at first, but accepts it when the Jackal shows that he has reanimated her father George Stacy, who is much better than he was before he died.

After the Jackal breaks up the fight between Spider-Man and Doctor Octopus, he shows Spider-Man around the New U Technologies. He was shown to have made reanimations of the villains Alistair Smythe, Bart Hamilton's Green Goblin form, Big Man, Eduardo Lobo, Hitman, a Hobgoblin, a Jack O'Lantern, Kangaroo I, Massacre, Mirage, Montana, a Mysterio, Ox I, a Rose, Spencer Smythe, Stilt-Man, and Tarantula as well as reanimations of Ashley Kafka, Jean DeWolff, and Spider-Woman. George Stacy recognizes something off about Gwen's face and points his gun at her. It was revealed that Gwen was actually the Gwen Stacy of Earth-65 that assists Spider-Man in escaping. The real Gwen Stacy is kidnapped by Kaine and taken to Parker Industries to be studied. Kaine reveals that he and Spider-Woman of Earth-65 came to this world to assist Spider-Man because they saw that apparently Spider-Man allying with the Jackal's offer on other worlds results in a global disaster in the form of the Carrion virus.

Spider-Man and Spider-Woman of Earth-65 escape after quickly incapacitating the Lizard thanks to the Prowler directing the cloned supervillains to another part of the city. Back at Horizon University, Kaine tells Max Modell, Hector Baez, and the rest of the employees about the Carrion virus and reveals his condition. The scientists figure they can use Kaine to try and find a cure for the virus since he is not contagious and decide to call the cops to alert them of the possible epidemic. However, Police Chief Anderson is secretly in league with the Jackal and informs him of Gwen Stacy's location. Jackal sends Electro and Rhino to retrieve Gwen and attends a meeting where he reveals his plan to move into Phase 2 of his project, allowing more New U Technologies factories and less government oversights. As Doctor Octopus is working on improving the cloning process, he is told by Jackal that he also plans to move to a new location since Spider-Man knows where he is. At Horizon University, the staff is attacked by Rhino and Electro. They retrieve Gwen, but Gwen tells them to take Kaine with him too since the condition could help with Jackal's experiments. Anna Maria Marconi also volunteers to come with since she has studied both Kaine and the drug. Spider-Man and Spider-Woman of Earth-65 arrive too late to New U Technologies to stop them and Spider-Woman of Earth-65 tells Spider-Man that she is there because Peter Parker has joined the Jackal in all the alternate dimensions she has been to. The New U Technologies staff tells Peter what happened. Before they go rescue Kaine and Anna, Kingpin shows up and reveals he has been following the Jackal's trail ever since the encounter with his cloned wife. He gives Spider-Man a folder containing the location of a meeting that Jackal will be at so Spider-Man can take him down for revenge. Spider-Man arrives at the airstrip where Jackal is receiving a large box and attacks him. Peter is surprised that Jackal is able to get the upper hand on him with enhanced strength and speed. Jackal takes off his mask and reveals himself to not be Miles Warren, but none other than Ben Reilly. He offers Peter the chance to bring back Uncle Ben as his corpse is in the large box.

In the Jackal's laboratory, Doctor Octopus is studying Kaine and Electro to perfect his "proto clone." Anna Maria is brought into the lab and becomes uncomfortable when Doctor Octopus starts appealing toward his love interest. Spider-Woman of Earth-65 follows her Earth-616 counterpart into the South New U Technologies facility to find Kaine. After Ben and Peter's confrontation, Ben starts driving Spider-Man to the New U Technologies facility with Uncle Ben's corpse and explains to Peter that he was able to make his company and vision come to life through emotionally blackmailing the higher-ups of society. He then shows Peter the "Haven," a section of the facility set up like a normal neighborhood where Peter sees all of his resurrected friends and enemies with the latest ones being Sally Avril, Ned Leeds, and Nick Katzenberg. He apologizes to the Stacys and Marla Jameson tells Spider-Man that she was honored by his vow not to let other people die. After J. Jonah Jameson heads upstairs to promote the New U Technologies on television, Spider-Man confronts Jackal and tells him that the reason he has not brought Uncle Ben back yet is because Peter knows Uncle Ben would tell Jackal that he is wrong and that he is using this power without responsibility. Jackal orders Spider-Man's rogues gallery to kill the hero and plans to replace Peter when he is dead. Prowler assists Spider-Man in battling the villains as Jackal heads back to his laboratory. Anna Maria reveals she knows how to stop the decaying process on the clones and Jackal offers her the "proto clone" body in exchange for the formula. Doctor Octopus takes offense to Jackal's comments on Maria's dwarfism and attacks his boss. Spider-Woman of Earth-65 uses the opportunity to try and free Kaine, but is attacked by Electro. Doctor Octopus pulls a switch which activates the Carrion virus in all of the clones and causes them to start rapidly decaying. Spider-Woman of Earth-65 escapes with Kaine as the Carrion virus starts spreading which causes Anna to also be affected. Spider-Man tries to appeal to Ben, but Jackal ignores him and takes over J. Jonah's broadcast to tell the world that they will all die and be reborn.

As New U Technologies' subjects continue to decay, Spider-Man decides to head toward Jackal's laboratory. Prowler and Jean DeWolff assist him with escaping from the villains. After George Stacy deteriorates in Gwen Stacy's arms, she assists Peter by helping him get to the lab. When they get to the lab doors, Gwen locks Spider-Man inside the lab and sacrifices herself toward the reanimated Hobgoblin and Green Goblin to give Spider-Man more time. Kaine is knocked out of the facility by Jackal. Spider-Woman of Earth-65 and Prowler assist him in containing the infected villains. During the ensuing melee, Lizard and his family escape, with Lizard stating that he can cure both Martha and Billy. Rhino was devastated when he witnesses Oksana dying. When Spider-Man makes it to the lab, Anna Maria tells him that she has invented an inverse frequency that can fix most of the problem. Doctor Octopus fights Jackal to allow Peter and Anna Maria the time to transmit the frequency. They go to the Fact Channel's filming location to see if they can transmit the signal and find Silk there, who tells them that Marla Jameson shut down the signal before deteriorating in her husband's arms. J. Jonah Jameson admits to Spider-Man that Peter Parker was right about the situation. Spider-Man hacks into the Webware Emergency System from Parker Industries and switches it to evoke from every Parker Industries device on the planet, which sends out a large signal that stops some of the other victims from decaying, but quickly affects some of the reanimated like Jackal and Doctor Octopus. Peter and Anna check the building and see that Jackal, Doctor Octopus, and Gwen Stacy have been reduced to dust. Anna notes that the "proto clone," or "Ultimate Template," appears missing. They come back to the front to check on Kaine and Spider-Woman of Earth-65's status. Kaine tells them that Prowler and DeWolff died fighting, while Spider-Woman of Earth-65 tells them that Electro and some of the cloned villains that survived the frequency and got away. Dr. Rita Clarkson comes out of the building and takes Spider-Man and his team downstairs where some of the New U Technologies patients are still alive. Some of the patients like Prowler were cured of the virus and still have a chance at living while some of them are slowly dying. Jerry Salteres emerges from one of the pods and Spider-Man tells him that he is unsure of how much of the promise he had made to Jerry's family to bring him home he can keep. Jerry is understanding and tells Spider-Man that he is only human.

Tie-ins

The Amazing Spider-Man
Trapped in Doctor Octopus' tentacles, Spider-Man expresses his disappointment that New U Technologies is cloning villains when they should be cloning other people like Prince. Doctor Octopus claims that he is the real Doctor Octopus and not a clone or a hologram. A flashback is shown that the Doctor Octopus-possessed Octobot went to Potter's Field where his body is buried to obtain some genetic material only to find that it was grave robbed alongside the corpses of Alistair Smythe and other villains. Making use of the Internet, the Doctor Octopus-possessed Octobot was confirmed of his suspicions upon finding out that New U Technologies was behind the grave robbing. Upon arriving at New U Technologies where his body is being held, the Doctor Octopus-possessed Octobot allowed his body to be cloned and perfected. Upon disposing of the copy of Peter Parker's conscious within the clone body, Doctor Octopus takes control of the body and emerges from the vat resembling his earlier appearance. Jackal was present where he presents him with his tentacle pack. Now an ally of Jackal, Doctor Octopus receives the special New U Pills to prevent his body from suffering clone degeneration.

Prior to Kaine's return to his Earth, it was revealed that Kaine's human body emerged from the Other's corpse similar to Peter's in the "Changes" storyline. After returning to the Great Web thanks to the Master Weaver, Kaine discovers that he is dying from a zombie-like Carrion virus that is a side-effect of Warren's cloning process, and is not allowed to go back to his Earth to avoid anyone catching it. Karn shows Kaine a number of realities with zombie apocalypses caused by this disease and Kaine decides to visit these realities to find a possible way to stop it as he would be immune to the attacks. He tries to keep himself hidden from Karn's Web Warriors while researching it, but is caught by Spider-Woman of Earth-65 who assists him in going to other worlds and trying to find research to stop the Carrion virus. Kaine discovers that all the downfalls of these realities was caused by Parker Industries teaming up with New U Technologies to spread Warren's technology which made the Carrion virus widespread. In one of the realities, they manage to steal research from Peter and Warren before battling that reality's Kaine who dies from the Carrion virus during their fight. They take the alternate Kaine's corpse to the Great Web to study it learning that Kaine himself is not contagious. Karn reveals that the events Kaine encountered in the other realities is starting to happen in Kaine's own reality. Since it is in the early process and Peter has not formed a full partnership with Warren yet, they still have a chance to stop it from happening. Their plan is to infiltrate New U Technologies and have Spider-Woman of Earth-65 replace the Gwen Stacy of Earth-616 to find out more about New U Technologies. While Spider-Woman of Earth-65 changes her looks, Kaine reveals to Karn that his research on his deceased counterpart led him to discover when he is going to die and he has very limited time. He kept it a secret from Spider-Woman of Earth-65 to make sure saving the Earth-616 reality is their top priority.

After Ben Reilly revealed that he was the Jackal to Peter, he tells Peter how he was resurrected and was motivated to create New U Technologies. After his death at the hands of the Green Goblin, Ben's dissolved remains were collected by Jackal and he was resurrected thanks to a new cloning process by Jackal. However, Jackal found problems with the cellular degradation. He had Ben killed 26 more times, all of which had Ben's life (and most of Peter's) flash before his eyes. As he was repeatedly killed, more of Ben's good memories were being pushed out. Ben eventually breaks free and knocks out Jackal. After he improves Warren's formula, he makes clones of Miles Warren and persuades Jackal that he is a clone, making it nearly impossible to tell who is the real one. Now free with a number of Miles Warren clones as his servants, Ben becomes the new Jackal and is determined to repay the people who have heavily influenced his and Peter's lives with Jackal's technology to make sure no one has to suffer again and those who have can become whole. Ben tells Peter that bringing back Uncle Ben is his gift to him and that even if Peter does not feel like he deserves to have his loved ones brought back, most of them do deserve a second chance at life. After hearing Ben's story and proposal, Peter becomes more interested in what Ben has to offer.

When Spider-Man is taken to Haven, he catches up with Gwen in the Stacy household in the facility, where she tries to convince him to support New U Technologies. Gwen does not understand why Peter is upset about seeing all his loved ones returned from the grave. Peter still has a hard time believing she is the real Gwen given his other experiences with clones. Gwen tries justifying her existence by telling Peter her memories, including how she overheard the Goblin talking to Spider-Man right before her death. Peter thinks she died hating him, but Gwen said that she did not hate him, but rather died feeling betrayed. After she had time to think, she understood that Peter continued to be Spider-Man to prevent anymore similar casualties. However, she is upset that Peter cannot let himself be with Mary Jane because he lets his duties as Spider-Man overpower his need for happiness. When Peter still has doubts toward Gwen not being a clone, she tries kissing him, but that only pushes him to put the mask back on. Gwen witnesses Jackal order the villains to kill Spider-Man and wants to help, but the alarm goes off and she and her father catch the Carrion virus.

When Spider-Man activates the Webware to stabilize the human and clone cells all across the world, the various Miles Warren clones deteriorate as Ben Reilly fights Doctor Octopus. The Warren clone that does not melt realizes he is the true Warren and vows to have revenge on Ben Reilly as the true Jackal. As Ben Reilly and Doctor Octopus start decaying, Ben Reilly tries transferring his mind into the finished proto-clone, but Doctor Octopus stops him and succeeds in transferring his mind instead. Ben Reilly takes the New U pills and steals a citizen's Webware to stabilize the cells in his body and goes back to his safehouse (which is a recreation of Peter's childhood home). He finds Warren in his Jackal outfit waiting in the living room. Jackal proceeds to burn Ben Reilly's house down and engages him in one final battle. Ben Reilly defeats Jackal and leaves him in the burning house to die and heads off pondering what he is going to do with his life.

Prowler
After stopping a bank robbery that a revived Madame Web (Cassandra Webb) foresaw, Prowler returns to the New U Technologies to stop a fight between Jack O'Lantern, Kangaroo I, Massacre, Mirage, Montana, and Tarantula I. Jackal reminds Prowler that he brought him back to keep the reanimated supervillains in line and that he wants Prowler to warn him when he leaves the building so his technology does not go out into the world. Knowing how annoying it is to be stuck in the same location, Jackal assigns Prowler to take care of a potential hacker in San Francisco. When Prowler goes to get more information on the hacker from Madame Web, she tells him that she sees buildings filled with agony that cannot escape. After confronting his killer Electro, Prowler figures out Madame Web's precognition and goes to Alcatraz where he sets off a trap and gets caught in the process.

Prowler wakes up in a cell in Alcatraz and discovers that the hacker is the current Madame Web Julia Carpenter who has been using leftover technology from Shroud to investigate New U Technologies. Prowler angers Julia Carpenter by severing the connection to stop her from looking more into New U Technologies. Back at the company, the cloned villains are getting out of control. Jackal sends Electro to find Prowler to put them under check again. Electro goes to Madame Web's room and tortures the telepath into giving her Prowler's location with the intent to kill him. Julia finds out that Madame Web is alive from telepathic feedback resulting from Electro's attack. Prowler tells Julia what New U Technologies has accomplished and tries to get her to join them, but she refuses and escapes in a puff of black smoke. Prowler's body then starts failing due to not taking his New U Pills for an extended period of time as he questions what he is doing with his life. Prowler is then found by Electro.

Prowler tries to escape Electro's wrath in Alcatraz, which proves difficult with her powers and his dying body. Using his weapons, the gift shop, and his strategic thinking, Prowler manages to defeat the simple-minded Electro. When he makes it outside, he is found by Julia, who takes him on her boat and heads toward New U Technologies to get his New U Pills.

Julia helps Prowler break into New U Technologies and takes Prowler to his room to get his New U Pills. As he starts recovering, Julia uses the opportunity to investigate the near-abandoned facility. She is led to Madame Web who refuses to take her medication to aid her in healing from Electro's attack. Madame Web has seen the future and refuses to be a part of it. Before dying of clone degeneration, Madame Web warns Julia to save Hobie. She leaves Prowler to continue looking into the facility. After recovering, Prowler aids Spider-Man in fighting the New U Technologies' villains and cloned villains when Jackal orders them to attack Spider-Man. When the alarm goes off and all the clones start breaking down from clone degeneration, Prowler leaves Haven and tries to find who set off the system that Is killing the clones. Prowler runs into Julia and accuses her of being the culprit. He tries to defeat her and Julia is left no choice but to fight back. She knocks him down as Prowler's body continues deteriorating.

During the final battle, Prowler and Jean DeWolff battle the villains outside. Prowler's body is rapidly decaying, but the two receive assistance from Spider-Woman of Earth-65 and Kaine. Spider-Woman of Earth-65 leaves Prowler in an alley when he proves too weak to continue and he is found by the murderous Electro. Julia Carpenter arrives and fends Electro off as she tells Prowler that Spider-Man has stabilized the human and clone cells. When Electro gets the upper hand on Julia, Prowler sacrifices himself to stop Electro and dies in Julia's arms. In the aftermath of the fight, Julia talks to the real Prowler who just emerged from cryo-sleep and tells him about his clone's actions.

Silk
Cindy Moon is glad to have her family back following her trip to the Negative Zone, but still feels distant from them and does not make as much of an effort to spend as much time with them. When J. Jonah Jameson wants one of his workers to investigate the New U scenario in San Francisco, Cindy volunteers to go to get away from the city as Hector Cervantez (now calling himself Spectro) accompanies her. Jameson is enthusiastic for her that her family is back together and leaves for dinner, but Cindy found something off about his behavior. She and Hector decide to investigate Jameson's room in New U Technologies and she uses her powers to create a different costume from her Silk outfit to avoid suspicion. Hector calls her new identity in this form "Silkworm" much to her annoyance. Cindy's suspicions are confirmed when she finds Jameson talking with his formerly-deceased wife while Spectro finds a room with a number of test subjects in capsules. Spectro triggers the intruder alert, prompting Cindy to escape. Before Cindy can leave, she is attacked by the resurrected Mattie Franklin.

Silk and Mattie fight each other on the rooftops of New U Technologies. Mattie tries to convince Silk that New U Technologies is doing good work and offers Silk a tour on the condition of removing her mask, but Silk escapes. Spectro cannot phase through the walls of the room with the test subject and is confronted by Doctor Octopus. The two fight, but Hector is knocked out by the arrival of Electro. Back at Cindy's home, her brother Albert talks to their father at night after one of his "long walks". Mr. Moon tells Albert that he still believes that Cindy's life would improve if he found a way to remove her powers with her mother overhearing the conversation. At Fact Channel, Cindy's co-workers and friends Rafferty and Lola look more into New U Technologies and tell Cindy they will update her with more information. Cindy is then approached in her apartment by J. Jonah Jameson. Cindy gives him Rafferty and Lola's research to voice skepticism on the New U Technologies and Jameson invites her to join him on a quick trip to the facility. He tells Cindy that he believes they are doing good work and introduces her to Mattie and Marla. In a different room of the building, Doctor Octopus is experimenting with Spectro and plans to put him back in a resurrected body.

After Jonah and Marla leave for Marla's treatment, Mattie tells Cindy that she knows she is Silk and takes her to investigate the facility. Mattie tells her that she is suspicious of the whole experiment as some of the other resurrected characters have been showing slight behavioral glitches and takes her to a place called "Haven" where they find Hector back in his own body. Back at Cindy's home, Mr. Moon has hidden a package that Cindy wanted Albert to open and tells Rafferty and Lola to stay out of their business while receiving instructions from a mysterious woman. At "Haven," an alarm goes off and starts affecting all the resurrected clones. Hector starts becoming Spectro again and prepares to attack Cindy.

J. Jonah Jameson's broadcast causes the Carrion virus to start spreading worldwide. Mattie helps Silk deal with Hector, who reverts to his ghostly form after his clone body disintegrates. The three head up to the broadcast center where the Carrion virus quickly spreads due to Marla Jameson opening the doors. Spider-Man and Anna Maria Marconi arrive to stop the broadcast as Mattie reveals to J. Jonah Jameson her superpowers. Silk holds the door back to prevent more infected hosts coming in, and Mattie saves her from one of the carriers infecting her and passes out in the process. After Spider-Man sends out the Webware Emergency Signal, J. Jonah Jameson and Silk find Marla and Mattie reduced to dust.

Aftermath
After getting Jerry Salteres out of his pod, Spider-Man uses his Webware to allow Jerry to talk to his wife Emma. After Jerry walks away coughing, Spider-Man tells Emma that Jerry has days to live due to still being in an unstable condition from the accident. Emma is outraged and threatens to sue Parker Industries before she ends her call. Before Peter expresses his anger at Kaine for not warning him about the other dimensions, Max Modell arrives with S.H.I.E.L.D. and Horizon University personnel to bring the exposed victims back for treatment. Kaine does not believe Ben Reilly is still dead and decides to go after him after Spider-Woman of Earth-65 heads back to her dimension. Rhino goes on a rampage after losing Oskana in New U Technologies, but Spider-Man manages to call him down by convincing him to move forward with his life for Oskana's sake. The two of them agree to see each other once in a while to help the other with their pain. Meanwhile in the sewers of San Francisco, Lizard has saved Martha and Billy Connors from the Carrion virus by injecting them with the Lizard formula, turning his wife and son into lizard-creatures like himself. At a local bar during the second story, Dr. Rita Clarkson unwinds from the day with a drink, but is met by a disguised and disfigured Ben Reilly. Though Rita has regretted what New U Technologies did, Ben still believed they were doing good for the people. He asks Rita for a loan, but she refuses until Ben saves her from some criminals who tried to kill her for New U Technologies' actions. She gives Ben a kiss before he heads off towards Broadway. Later at night during the third story, Spider-Man is seen beating up most of the Kingpin's henchmen at a restaurant in Chinatown. Kingpin tells Spider-Man that he is ready to repay his debt and gives Spider-Man a flash drive that has the location of Norman Osborn.

Titles involved

Lead-in issues
 Amazing Spider-Man vol. 4 #16-19
 Free Comic Book Day 2016 (Captain America)

Main issues
 The Clone Conspiracy #1-5

Tie-ins
 Amazing Spider-Man vol. 4 #20-24
 Prowler vol. 2 #1-5
 Silk vol. 2 #14-17

Aftermath issue
 The Clone Conspiracy: Omega #1

Critical Reception 
The main series received generally mixed reviews. According to Comic Book Roundup, the main series received a score of 7.3 out of 10 based on 48 reviews. 

According to Comic Book Roundup, Issue 1 received a score of 8 out of 10 based on  16 reviews.

According to Comic Book Roundup, Issue 2 received a score of 6.9 out of 10 based on 8 reviews. 

According to Comic Book Roundup, Issue 3 received a score of 6.7 out of 10 based on 7 reviews. 

According to Comic Book Roundup, Issue 4 received a score of 8.2 out of 10 based on 7 reviews. 

According to Comic Book Roundup, Issue 5 received a score of 6.7 out of 10 based on 10 reviews. 

According to Comic Book Roundup, The Clone Conspiracy: Omega Issue 1 received a score of 6.6 out of 10 based on 7 reviews.

Collected editions

References

External links
 Spider-Man: The Clone Conspiracy Reading Order Checklist at How to Love Comics
 

2016 comics debuts
Comics about cloning
Fiction about resurrection